Lists of covers of Time magazine list the people or topics on the cover of Time magazine. Time was first published in 1923. As Time became established as one of the United States' leading news magazines, an appearance on the cover of Time became an indicator of notability, fame or notoriety. The lists are organized by decade.

Lists
1923–1929
1930–1939
1940–1949
1950–1959
1960–1969
1970–1979
1980–1989
1990–1999
2000–2009
2010–2019
2020–2029

External links
 Time The Vault